The 2020–21 Sacred Heart Pioneers men's basketball team represented Sacred Heart University during the 2020–21 NCAA Division I men's basketball season. This was the Pioneers' 22nd season of NCAA Division I basketball, all played in the Northeast Conference. The Pioneers are led by eighth-year head coach Anthony Latina and play their home games at the William H. Pitt Center in Fairfield, Connecticut.

Previous season 
The Pioneers finished the 2019–20 season 20–13, 12–6 in NEC play to finish in fourth place. They defeated Mount St. Mary's in the quarterfinals of the NEC tournament before losing in the semifinals to Saint Francis (PA). With 20 wins, they were a candidate for postseason play. However, all postseason tournaments were cancelled amid the COVID-19 pandemic.

Roster

Schedule and results

|-
!colspan=9 style=| Regular season

  

|-
!colspan=9 style=| NEC tournament

source

References 

Sacred Heart Pioneers men's basketball seasons
Sacred Heart
Sacred Heart Pioneers men's b
Sacred Heart Pioneers men's b